Joanne Kilbourn is a fictional Canadian detective, who appears in mystery novels by Gail Bowen.

Overview
In Deadly Appearances, the first Kilbourn novel, she is a political strategist and advisor to Andy Boychuk, a politician who is murdered just hours after being elected Leader of the Opposition in the Legislative Assembly of Saskatchewan. Kilbourn is forced to solve his murder while contending with the fact that the murderer is attempting to kill her too. In later novels, Kilbourn subsequently changes careers, becoming a political science professor in Regina, and later serves as a political commentator with a local television station. In the course of the later novels, she solves crimes committed both within the academic community and throughout the province of Saskatchewan.

Kilbourn is also a widow, whose husband was himself murdered several years before the events of Deadly Appearances. In A Colder Kind of Death, she is forced to investigate the killing of her late husband's murderer.

Adaptations
Six of the Kilbourn mysteries were adapted for television by Shaftesbury Films and CTV. Wendy Crewson played Kilbourn. Victor Garber, and later Shawn Doyle played her police assistants.

List of films
Love and Murder (2000) (adapted from Murder at the Mendel)
Deadly Appearances (2000)
The Wandering Souls Murders (2001)
A Colder Kind of Death (2001)
A Killing Spring (2002)
Verdict in Blood (2002)

Joanne Kilbourn mysteries
 Deadly Appearances, 1990
 Murder at the Mendel, 1991
 The Wandering Soul Murders, 1992
 A Colder Kind of Death, 1994
 A Killing Spring, 1996
 Verdict in Blood, 1998
 Burying Ariel, 2000
 The Glass Coffin, 2002
 The Last Good Day, 2004
 The Endless Knot, 2006
 The Brutal Heart, 2008
 The Nesting Dolls, 2010
 Kaleidoscope, 2012
 The Gifted, 2013
 12 Rose Street, 2015
 What's Left Behind, 2016
 Winner's Circle, 2017
 A Darkness of the Heart, 2018
 The Unlocking Season, 2020
 An Image in the Lake, 2021

References

Fictional amateur detectives
Fictional Canadian people
Fictional characters from Saskatchewan
Saskatchewan in fiction